The 2017 season was the Hawthorn Football Club's 93rd season in the Australian Football League and 116th overall, the 18th season playing home games at the Melbourne Cricket Ground, the 17th season playing home games at the newly named University of Tasmania Stadium, the 13th season under head coach Alastair Clarkson, and the 1st season with Jarryd Roughead as club captain. This was the first time since 2013 that Hawthorn didn't enter the season as the defending premiers.

Hawthorn started the season 0–4 for the first time since 1998. Hawthorn failed to match their 17–5 record from 2016, finishing in 12th with a  record. This was also the first time since 2005, Hawthorn were defeated by Carlton. This was also the first time under Clarkson that no player kicked 50 goals for the season.

Club summary
The 2017 AFL season is the 121st season of the VFL/AFL competition since its inception in 1897; having entered the competition in 1925, it was the 93rd season contested by the Hawthorn Football Club. Tasmania and iiNet continued as the club's two major sponsors, as they had done since 2006 and 2013 respectively, while Adidas continued to manufacture the club's on-and-off field apparel, as they had done since 2013. Hawthorn continued its alignment with the Box Hill Hawks Football Club in the Victorian Football League, allowing Hawthorn-listed players to play with the Box Hill Hawks when not selected in AFL matches.

Senior personnel
Alastair Clarkson continued as the club's head coach for the thirteenth consecutive season. In a surprise announcement, Jarryd Roughead replaced Luke Hodge as the club's captain on 20 January 2017 after the latter had led the club since 2011.

It was announced in December 2016 that Stuart Fox would leave his position as the club's Chief Executive Officer to take up the same position with the Melbourne Cricket Club at the end of February 2017. On 1 May, Tracey Gaudry was appointed the club's new CEO.

Playing list changes 
The following lists all player changes between the conclusion of the 2016 season and the beginning of the 2017 season.

Trades

Free agency

Additions

Draft

AFL draft

Rookie draft

Retirements and delistings

2017 player squad

Season summary

Pre-season matches
The club played three practice matches as part of the 2017 JLT Community Series, and will be played under modified pre-season rules, including nine-point goals.

Premiership season

Fixture summary

The full fixture was announced on 27 October 2016. The Melbourne Cricket Ground once again acted as Hawthorn's primary home ground, hosting six of the club's eleven home games, with four home games played at their secondary home ground, University of Tasmania Stadium, in Launceston, and one home game played at Etihad Stadium against the Western Bulldogs in round 23.

The club's first home game came the following round, when it hosted 2016 finalists  at the Melbourne Cricket Ground in round two. It travelled to Adelaide twice for matches against  and Adelaide (for a second time) in rounds 11 and 14 respectively, while it also travelled to the Gold Coast, Sydney and Perth once each, in rounds three, ten and eighteen respectively. Additionally, it played three Friday night matches (two against  and one against the Western Bulldogs) and two Thursday night matches (both at the Adelaide Oval) during the regular season, while ten of the club's 21 matches were broadcast on free-to-air.

Based on its finishing position from 2016, Hawthorn's fixture was rated the second-most difficult (only behind ) by The Age; it was the fifth consecutive season in which it has been dealt either the most or second-most difficult fixture of any club.

Fixture

Ladder

Awards, records and milestones

Awards
Peter Crimmins Medal: Tom Mitchell
All-Australian team: Tom Mitchell
22 Under 22 team: Ryan Burton, James Sicily

Records
 Round 7:
 Alastair Clarkson won his 182nd game as coach, which is the most of any Hawthorn coach.
 Ben McEvoy had 53 hitouts, which is the most recorded by a Hawthorn player
 Round 9:
 Tom Mitchell had 50 disposals, which is the most recorded by a Hawthorn player.
Round 18:
Alastair Clarkson coached his 300th game, which is the most of any Hawthorn coach.

Milestones
Round 1:
Ricky Henderson – Hawthorn debut
Tom Mitchell – Hawthorn debut
Jaeger O'Meara – Hawthorn debut
Ty Vickery – Hawthorn debut
Round 2:
Teia Miles – AFL debut
Josh Gibson – 150th game for Hawthorn
Tom Mitchell – 1st goal for Hawthorn
Ty Vickery – 1st goal for Hawthorn
Round 3:
Jaeger O'Meara – 1st goal for Hawthorn
Round 4:
Ben McEvoy – 150th AFL game
Will Langford – 50th AFL game
Round 5:
Jarryd Roughead – 500th AFL goal
Liam Shiels – 50th AFL goal
Round 7:
Billy Hartung – 50th AFL game
Round 8:
Liam Shiels – 150th AFL game
Ricky Henderson – 1st goal for Hawthorn
Round 10:
Luke Breust – 150th AFL game
Brendan Whitecross – 100th AFL game
James Cousins – AFL debut 
Dallas Willsmore – AFL debut
James Cousins – 1st AFL goal
Round 14:
Ricky Henderson – 100th AFL game
Round 15:
Ricky Henderson – 50th AFL goal
Round 16:
Isaac Smith – 150th AFL game
Round 17:
Luke Hodge – 300th AFL game
Round 18:
Alastair Clarkson – 300th AFL game as coach
Conor Glass – AFL debut
Round 19:
Shaun Burgoyne – 100th goal for Hawthorn
Round 20:
Jarryd Roughead – 250th AFL game
Teia Miles – 1st AFL goal
Round 21:
Luke Breust – 300th AFL goal
Round 22:
Taylor Duryea – 100th AFL game
Round 23:
Jaeger O'Meara – 50th AFL game

Brownlow Medal

Results

Brownlow Medal tally

Tribunal cases

References

Hawthorn Football Club Season, 2017
Hawthorn Football Club seasons